Gnome Ranger II: Ingrid's Back is a text adventure game by Level 9 released in 1988. It is the sequel to Gnome Ranger The game is a standard text adventure with limited graphics on some platforms. Again, a short novella by Peter McBride is included ("The 2nd Gnettlefield Journal") explaining the background to the story and providing hints for play.

Plot
Having just returned from her "holiday" in the wilderness, the gnome Ingrid Bottomlow must save her home village of Little Moaning from destruction by a greedy property developer, Jasper Quickbuck. To do this she must get the various uncooperative inhabitants of the village to sign her petition.

Gameplay
Gameplay is similar to Gnome Ranger. The player must explore Ingrid's village while collecting signatures for her petition by interacting with various non-player characters.

Reception

Computer and Video Games gave Ingrid's Back a very favorable review, with reviewer Keith Cambpell calling it "the most enjoyable Level 9 adventure [he had] played to date" and praising its humor and difficulty curve.

References

External links
 
 Ingrid's Back at Lemon Amiga
 Ingrid's Back at Lemon 64
 

1980s interactive fiction
1988 video games
Amiga games
Amstrad CPC games
Amstrad PCW games
Atari 8-bit family games
Atari ST games
BBC Micro and Acorn Electron games
Commodore 64 games
DOS games
Level 9 Computing games
MSX games
Video games developed in the United Kingdom
Video games featuring female protagonists
ZX Spectrum games